This list of fossil fishes described in 2019 is a list of new taxa of jawless vertebrates, placoderms, acanthodians, fossil cartilaginous fishes, bony fishes, and other fishes of every kind that were described during the year 2019, as well as other significant discoveries and events related to paleoichthyology that occurred in 2019.

New taxa

Jawless vertebrates

Placoderms

Acanthodians

Cartilaginous fishes

Ray-finned fishes
{| class="wikitable sortable" align="center" width="100%"
|-
! Name
! Novelty
! Status
! Authors
! Age
! Type locality
! Country
! Notes
! Images
|-
|
Acronuroides
|
Gen. et sp. nov.
|
Valid
|
Bannikov, Carnevale & Tyler
|
Eocene (late Ypresian)
|
Monte Bolca locality
|

|
A member of Percomorphacea of uncertain phylogenetic placement. The type species is A. eocaenicus.
|
|-
|
Acropoma aurora
|
Sp. nov
|
Valid
|
Schwarzhans
|
Mangaorapan to Bortonian
|
|

|
A species of Acropoma.
|
|-
|
Ambassis simesi
|
Sp. nov
|
Valid
|
Schwarzhans
|
Bortonian
|
|

|
A species of Ambassis.
|
|-
|
Ampheristus pentlandensis
|
Sp. nov
|
Valid
|
Schwarzhans
|
Bortonian
|
|

|
A member of the family Ophidiidae.
|
|-
|
Antigonia artata
|
Sp. nov
|
Valid
|
Schwarzhans
|
Waipawan-Heretaungan
|
|

|
A species of Antigonia.
|
|-
|
Antimyctophum
|
Gen. et comb. nov
|
Valid
|
Schwarzhans
|
Clifdenian to Tongaporutuan
|
|

|
A lanternfish. The type species is "Scopelus" konganaruensis Frost (1933).
|
|-
|
Archoplites langrellorum
|
Sp. nov
|
Valid
|
Van Tassell & Smith
|
Pliocene (Blancan)
|
|
()
|
A relative of the Sacramento perch.
|
|-
|
Ardoreosomus
|
Gen. et sp. nov
|
Valid
|
Romano et al.
|
Early Triassic (Induan)
|
Candelaria Formation
|
()
|
A member of the family Ptycholepidae. Genus includes new species A. occidentalis.
|
|-
|
Argyripnus oamaruensis
|
Sp. nov
|
Valid
|
Schwarzhans
|
Otaian and Altonian
|
|

|
A species of Argyripnus.
|
|-
|
Argyripnus rapahoensis
|
Sp. nov
|
Valid
|
Schwarzhans
|
Runangan
|
|

|
A species of Argyripnus.
|
|-
|
Arnoglossus lautus
|
Sp. nov
|
Valid
|
Schwarzhans
|
Duntroonian and Waitakian
|
|

|
A scaldfish.
|
|-
|
Arnoglossus purus
|
Sp. nov
|
Valid
|
Schwarzhans
|
Lillburnian and Waiauan
|
|

|
A scaldfish.
|
|-
|
Artediellichthys candelabrum
|
Sp. nov
|
Valid
|
Nazarkin
|
Miocene
|
Agnevo Formation
|
()
|
A relative of the blackfin hookear sculpin.
|
|-
|
Artediellus simplex
|
Sp. nov
|
Valid
|
Nazarkin
|
Miocene
|
Agnevo Formation
|
()
|
A species of Artediellus.
|
|-
|
Aseraggodes hudsoni
|
Sp. nov
|
Valid
|
Schwarzhans
|
Altonian
|
|

|
A species of Aseraggodes.
|
|-
|
Auchenoceros simplex
|
Sp. nov
|
Valid
|
Schwarzhans
|
Duntroonian
|
|

|
A relative of the ahuru.
|
|-
|
Aulichthys miocaenicus
|
Sp. nov
|
Valid
|
Nazarkin
|
Miocene (Serravallian–Tortonian)
|
Agnevo Formation
|
()
|
An extinct tubenose.
|
|-
|
Ausonasynodus
|
Gen. et sp. nov
|
Valid
|
Carnevale et al.
|
Late Eocene
|
|

|
A lizardfish. Genus includes new species A. almerai.
|
|-
|
Awamoa
|
Gen. et comb. et sp. nov
|
Valid
|
Schwarzhans
|
Otaian to Opoitian
|
|

|
A southern sandfish. The type species is "Leptoscopus" progressus Schwarzhans (1980); genus also includes "Leptoscopus" iocosus Schwarzhans (1980) and a new species A. kaawa.
|
|-
|
Balistes vegai
|
Sp. nov
|
Valid
|
Viñola Lopez, Carr & Lorenzo
|
Miocene
|
|

|
A species of Balistes.
|
|-
|
Barathronus nielseni
|
Sp. nov
|
Valid
|
Schwarzhans
|
Otaian
|
|

|
A species of Barathronus.
|
|-
|
Barbalepis
|
Gen. et comb. nov
|
Valid
|
Olive, Taverne & López-Arbarello
|
Early Cretaceous (Barremian–Aptian)
|
|

|
A member the family Coccolepididae; a new genus for "Coccolepis" macroptera Traquair.
|
|-
|
Bathycongrus waihaoensis
|
Sp. nov
|
Valid
|
Schwarzhans
|
Kaiatan
|
|

|
A member of the family Congridae. Originally described as a species of Bathycongrus, but subsequently transferred to the genus Smithconger.
|
|-
|
Bathygadus waiohaensis
|
Sp. nov
|
Valid
|
Schwarzhans
|
Otaian
|
|

|
A species of Bathygadus.
|
|-
|
Bembrops aequiformis
|
Sp. nov
|
Valid
|
Schwarzhans
|
Duntroonian and Waitakian
|
|

|
A species of Bembrops.
|
|-
|
Bembrops grenfelli
|
Sp. nov
|
Valid
|
Schwarzhans
|
Altonian
|
|

|
A species of Bembrops.
|
|-
|
Benthosema minutum
|
Sp. nov
|
Valid
|
Schwarzhans
|
Altonian
|
|

|
A species of Benthosema.
|
|-
|
Bidenichthys struthersi
|
Sp. nov
|
Valid
|
Schwarzhans
|
Altonian
|
|

|
A species of Bidenichthys.
|
|-
|
Blachea semeniformis
|
Sp. nov
|
Valid
|
Schwarzhans
|
Waitakian to Altonian
|
|

|
A species of Blachea.
|
|-
|
Bonapartia altidorsalis
|
Sp. nov
|
Valid
|
Schwarzhans
|
Otaian and Altonian
|
|

|
A member of the family Gonostomatidae.
|
|-
|
Brosmophyciops tongarewae
|
Sp. nov
|
Valid
|
Schwarzhans
|
Mangaorapan-Heretaungan
|
|

|
A species of Brosmophyciops.
|
|-
|
Burguklia minichorum
|
Sp. nov
|
Valid
|
Bakaev & Kogan
|
Permian (Wordian–Capitanian)
|
|

|
An early ray-finned fish. Announced in 2019; the final version of the article naming it was published in 2020.
|
|-
|
Cabindachanos
|
Gen. et sp. nov
|
Valid
|
Taverne et al.
|
Paleocene (Danian or early Selandian)
|
|

|
A member of the family Chanidae. The type species is C. dartevellei.
|
|-
|
Callionymus hakatarameaensis
|
Sp. nov
|
Valid
|
Schwarzhans
|
Waitakian
|
|

|
A species of Callionymus.
|
|-
|
Callionymus triquetrus
|
Sp. nov
|
Valid
|
Schwarzhans
|
Altonian
|
|

|
A species of Callionymus.
|
|-
|
Candelarialepis
|
Gen. et sp. nov
|
Valid
|
Romano et al.
|
Early Triassic (Induan)
|
Candelaria Formation
|
()
|
A stem-neopterygian belonging to the family Parasemionotidae. Genus includes new species C. argentus.
|
|-
|
Cavinichthys
|
Gen. et sp. nov
|
Valid
|
Taverne & Capasso
|
Early Cretaceous (Albian)
|
Limestones of Pietraroja
|

|
A member of Crossognathiformes belonging to the family Pachyrhizodontidae. The type species is C. pachylepis.
|
|-
|
Cephalopholis? aotearoa
|
Sp. nov
|
Valid
|
Schwarzhans
|
Mangaorapan to Bortonian
|
|

|
Possibly a species of Cephalopholis.
|
|-
|
Cepola ambifaria
|
Sp. nov
|
Valid
|
Schwarzhans
|
Otaian to Clifdenian
|
|

|
A species of Cepola.
|
|-
|
Ceratoscopelus richardsoni
|
Sp. nov
|
Valid
|
Schwarzhans
|
Otaian and Altonian
|
|

|
A species of Ceratoscopelus.
|
|-
|
Champsodon timaruensis
|
Sp. nov
|
Valid
|
Schwarzhans
|
Altonian
|
|

|
A species of Champsodon.
|
|-
|
Chaunax bucculentus
|
Sp. nov
|
Valid
|
Schwarzhans
|
Waitakian
|
|

|
A species of Chaunax.
|
|-
|
Chaychanus
|
Gen. et sp. nov
|
Valid
|
Cantalice Severiano, Alvarado Ortega & Bellwood
|
Paleocene
|
|

|
A member of the family Pomacentridae. Genus includes new species C. gonzalezorum. Announced in 2019; the final version of the article naming it was published in 2020.
|
|-
|
Chrionema salebrosa
|
Sp. nov
|
Valid
|
Schwarzhans
|
Duntroonian to Altonian
|
|

|
A species of Chrionema.
|
|-
|
Coelorinchus divulgatus
|
Sp. nov
|
Valid
|
Schwarzhans
|
Waitakian to Lillburnian
|
|

|
A species of Coelorinchus.
|
|-
|
Coelorinchus pakaurangiensis
|
Sp. nov
|
Valid
|
Schwarzhans
|
Duntroonian to Otaian
|
|

|
A species of Coelorinchus.
|
|-
|
Coelorinchus preaustralis
|
Sp. nov
|
Valid
|
Schwarzhans
|
Duntroonian to Altonian
|
|

|
A species of Coelorinchus.
|
|-
|
Colobodus wushaensis
|
Sp. nov
|
Valid
|
Li et al.
|
Late Triassic (Carnian)
|
Falang Formation
|

|
A member of Perleidiformes.
|
|-
|
Conger davidsmithi
|
Sp. nov
|
Valid
|
Schwarzhans
|
Waipawan to Bortonian
|
|

|
A species of Conger.
|
|-
|
Conger tokoroa
|
Sp. nov
|
Valid
|
Schwarzhans
|
Altonian
|
|

|
A species of Conger.
|
|-
|
Congopycnodus
|
Gen. et sp. nov
|
Valid
|
Taverne
|
Middle Jurassic
|
Stanleyville Formation
|

|
A member of Pycnodontiformes belonging to the superfamily Coccodontoidea. The type species is C. cornutus.
|
|-
|
Costapycnodus
|
Gen. et comb. nov
|
Valid
|
Taverne, Capasso & Del Re
|
Early Cretaceous (late Hauterivian-early Barremian)
|
|

|
A member of the family Pycnodontidae. The type species is "Coelodus" costae Heckel (1856).
|
|-
|
Danaphos glomerosus
|
Sp. nov
|
Valid
|
Schwarzhans
|
Otaian
|
|

|
A species of Danaphos.
|
|-
|
Diaphus audax
|
Sp. nov
|
Valid
|
Schwarzhans
|
Waitakian to Altonian
|
|

|
A species of Diaphus.
|
|-
|
Diaphus caurus
|
Sp. nov
|
Valid
|
Schwarzhans & Ohe
|
Pleistocene (Calabrian)
|
Hijikata Formation
|

|
A species of Diaphus.
|
|-
|
Diaphus endoi
|
Sp. nov
|
Valid
|
Schwarzhans & Ohe
|
Pliocene (Piacenzian)
|
Shinzato Formation
|

|
A species of Diaphus.
|
|-
|
Diaphus exilis
|
Sp. nov
|
Valid
|
Schwarzhans
|
Otaian to Lillburnian
|
|

|
A species of Diaphus.
|
|-
|
Diaphus grebneffi
|
Sp. nov
|
Valid
|
Schwarzhans & Ohe
|
Probably Piacenzian
|
Nakosi Formation
|

|
A species of Diaphus.
|
|-
|
Diaphus huatau
|
Sp. nov
|
Valid
|
Schwarzhans
|
Clifdenian to Lillburnian
|
|

|
A species of Diaphus.
|
|-
|
Diaphus kaiparaensis
|
Sp. nov
|
Valid
|
Schwarzhans
|
Otaian and Altonian
|
|

|
A species of Diaphus.
|
|-
|
Diaphus kakegawaensis
|
Sp. nov
|
Valid
|
Schwarzhans & Ohe
|
Pleistocene (Gelasian)
|
Dainichi Formation
|

|
A species of Diaphus.
|
|-
|
Diaphus manneringi
|
Sp. nov
|
Valid
|
Schwarzhans
|
Clifdenian to Waiauan
|
|

|
A species of Diaphus.
|
|-
|
Diaphus mirus
|
Sp. nov
|
Valid
|
Schwarzhans
|
Tongaporutuan
|
|

|
A species of Diaphus.
|
|-
|
Diaphus nafpaktitisi
|
Sp. nov
|
Valid
|
Schwarzhans & Ohe
|
Pliocene (Piacenzian)
|
Nobori Formation
|

|
A species of Diaphus.
|
|-
|
Diaphus noboriensis
|
Sp. nov
|
Valid
|
Schwarzhans & Ohe
|
Pliocene (Piacenzian) and Pleistocene (Gelasian)
|
Dainichi Formation
Nobori Formation
Shinzato Formation
|

|
A species of Diaphus.
|
|-
|
Diaphus tenax
|
Sp. nov
|
Valid
|
Schwarzhans
|
Altonian
|
|

|
A species of Diaphus.
|
|-
|
Dibranchus kakahoensis
|
Sp. nov
|
Valid
|
Schwarzhans
|
Bortonian
|
|

|
A species of Dibranchus.
|
|-
|
Diogenichthys rangiauriensis
|
Sp. nov
|
Valid
|
Schwarzhans
|
Mangapanian
|
|

|
A species of Diogenichthys.
|
|-
|
Dipulus certus
|
Sp. nov
|
Valid
|
Schwarzhans
|
Mangaorapan-Heretaungan
|
|

|
A species of Dipulus.
|
|-
|
Dolichopteryx iustus
|
Sp. nov
|
Valid
|
Schwarzhans
|
Altonian
|
|

|
A species of Dolichopteryx.
|
|-
|
Echiodon teres
|
Sp. nov
|
Valid
|
Schwarzhans
|
Otaian to Clifdenian
|
|

|
A species of Echiodon.
|
|-
|
Electrona subasperoides
|
Sp. nov
|
Valid
|
Schwarzhans
|
Waitakian to Altonian
|
|

|
A species of Electrona.
|
|-
|
Ellimma longipectoralis
|
Sp. nov
|
Valid
|
Polck et al.
|
Early Cretaceous (Aptian)
|
Barra Velha Formation
|

|
A member of Clupeomorpha belonging to the group Ellimmichthyiformes and to the family Paraclupeidae. Announced in 2019; the final version of the article naming it was published in 2020.
|
|-
|
Emmelichthys tennysoni
|
Sp. nov
|
Valid
|
Schwarzhans
|
Waitakian
|
|

|
A species of Emmelichthys.
|
|-
|
Encheliophis strigosus
|
Sp. nov
|
Valid
|
Schwarzhans
|
Otaian and Altonian
|
|

|
A species of Encheliophis.
|
|-
|
Eomyctophum broncus
|
Sp. nov
|
Valid
|
Schwarzhans
|
Waipawan to Porangan
|
|

|
A lanternfish.
|
|-
|
Eomyctophum porokawa
|
Sp. nov
|
Valid
|
Schwarzhans
|
Bortonian
|
|

|
A lanternfish.
|
|-
|
Eosemionotus diskosomus
|
Sp. nov
|
Valid
|
López-Arbarello et al.
|
Middle Triassic (Ladinian)
|
Meride Limestone
|

|
A member of Semionotiformes.
|
|-
|
Eosemionotus minutus
|
Sp. nov
|
Valid
|
López-Arbarello et al.
|
Middle Triassic (Ladinian)
|
Meride Limestone
|

|
A member of Semionotiformes.
|
|-
|
Eosemionotus sceltrichensis
|
Sp. nov
|
Valid
|
López-Arbarello et al.
|
Middle Triassic (Ladinian)
|
Meride Limestone
|

|
A member of Semionotiformes.
|
|-
|
Epaelops
|
Gen. et sp. nov
|
Valid
|
Alves, Alvarado-Ortega & Brito
|
Early Cretaceous (Albian)
|
Tlayúa Formation
|

|
A member of Elopiformes. Genus includes new species E. martinezi. Announced in 2019; the final version of the article naming it was published in 2020. 
|
|-
|
Epigonus aquilonius
|
Sp. nov
|
Valid
|
Schwarzhans
|
Otaian and Altonian
|
|

|
A species of Epigonus.
|
|-
|
Epigonus opoitiensis
|
Sp. nov
|
Valid
|
Schwarzhans
|
Opoitian
|
|

|
A species of Epigonus.
|
|-
|
Etrumeus carnatus
|
Sp. nov
|
Valid
|
Schwarzhans
|
Altonian
|
|

|
A species of Etrumeus.
|
|-
|
Evynnis abax
|
Sp. nov
|
Valid
|
Schwarzhans
|
Duntroonian to Altonian
|
|

|
A member of the family Sparidae.
|
|-
|
Flagellipinna
|
Gen. et sp. nov
|
Valid
|
Cawley & Kriwet
|
Late Cretaceous (Cenomanian)
|
Sannine Formation
|

|
A member of Pycnodontiformes belonging to the family Pycnodontidae. The type species is F. rhomboides.
|
|-
|
Forsterygion jawadi
|
Sp. nov
|
Valid
|
Schwarzhans
|
Nukumaruan
|
|

|
A species of Forsterygion.
|
|-
|
Gadiculus adversus
|
Sp. nov
|
Valid
|
Schwarzhans
|
Waitakian to Lillburnian
|
|

|
A species of Gadiculus.
|
|-
|
Gadiculus pereawa
|
Sp. nov
|
Valid
|
Schwarzhans
|
Tongaporutuan
|
|

|
A species of Gadiculus.
|
|-
|
Galeichthys ohei
|
Sp. nov
|
Valid
|
Schwarzhans
|
Opoitian to Nukumaruan
|
|

|
A species of Galeichthys.
|
|-
|
Gilmourella
|
Gen. et sp. nov.
|
Valid
|
Carnevale & Bannikov
|
Eocene (late Ypresian)
|
Monte Bolca locality
|

|
A member of Callionymoidei. The type species is G. minuta.
|
|-
|
Gnathophis araroa
|
Sp. nov
|
Valid
|
Schwarzhans
|
Kapitean
|
|

|
A species of Gnathophis.
|
|-
|
Gonostoma retunsum
|
Sp. nov
|
Valid
|
Schwarzhans
|
Otaian and Altonian
|
|

|
A species of Gonostoma.
|
|-
|
Grahamichthys frigophila
|
Sp. nov
|
Valid
|
Schwarzhans
|
Altonian
|
|

|
A member of the family Thalasseleotrididae.
|
|-
|
Guus
|
Gen. et comb. nov.
|
Valid
|
Bannikov
|
Eocene (late Ypresian)
|
Monte Bolca locality
|

|
A member of the family Tortonesidae. The type species is "Gobius" microcephalus Agassiz (1839).
|
|-
|
Gyrodus huiliches
|
Sp. nov
|
Valid
|
Gouiric-Cavalli, Remírez & Kriwet
|
Early Cretaceous (Valanginian–early Hauterivian)
|
Agrio Formation
|

|
|
|-
|
Harpagifer? morgansi
|
Sp. nov
|
Valid
|
Schwarzhans
|
Altonian
|
|

|
Possibly a species of Harpagifer.
|
|-
|
Hemerocoetes pukunati
|
Sp. nov
|
Valid
|
Schwarzhans
|
Duntroonian to Altonian
|
|

|
A species of Hemerocoetes.
|
|-
|
Hemerocoetes whiroki
|
Sp. nov
|
Valid
|
Schwarzhans
|
Duntroonian to Altonian
|
|

|
A species of Hemerocoetes.
|
|-
|
Hiascoactinus
|
Gen. et sp. nov
|
Valid
|
Kim et al.
|
Late Triassic
|
Amisan Formation
|

|
A member of Redfieldiiformes. Genus includes new species H. boryeongensis. Announced in 2019; the final version of the article naming it was published in 2020.
|
|-
|
Hintonia robertsi
|
Sp. nov
|
Valid
|
Schwarzhans
|
Otaian
|
|

|
A lanternfish.
|
|-
|
Howella monodens
|
Sp. nov
|
Valid
|
Schwarzhans
|
Otaian
|
|

|
A species of Howella.
|
|-
|
Hygophum acutiventris
|
Sp. nov
|
Valid
|
Schwarzhans
|
Kapitean
|
|

|
A species of Hygophum.
|
|-
|
Ichthyscopus pukeuriensis
|
Sp. nov
|
Valid
|
Schwarzhans
|
Otaian and Altonian
|
|

|
A species of Ichthyscopus.
|
|-
|
Klincigobius
|
Gen. et comb. et sp. nov
|
Valid
|
Bradić-Milinović, Ahnelt & Schwarzhans in Bradić-Milinović et al.
|
Early Miocene
|
|

|
A member of the family Gobiidae. The type species is "Gobius" serbiensis Gaudant (1998); genus also includes new species K. andjelkovicae.
|
|-
|
Kradimus
|
Gen. et sp. nov
|
Valid
|
Veysey, Brito & Martill
|
Late Cretaceous (Turonian)
|
Akrabou Formation
|

|
A member of Crossognathiformes. Genus includes new species K. asflaensis. Announced in 2019; the final version of the article naming it was published in 2020.
|
|-
|
Lactarius primigenius
|
Sp. nov
|
Valid
|
Schwarzhans
|
Bortonian to Kaiatan
|
|

|
A relative of the false trevally.
|
|-
|
Lactarius pusillus
|
Sp. nov
|
Valid
|
Schwarzhans
|
Otaian and Altonian
|
|

|
A relative of the false trevally.
|
|-
|
Laeops undulatus
|
Sp. nov
|
Valid
|
Schwarzhans
|
Lillburnian
|
|

|
A species of Laeops.
|
|-
|
Lampanyctodes transitivus
|
Sp. nov
|
Valid
|
Schwarzhans
|
Kapitean
|
|

|
A lanternfish.
|
|-
|
Lampanyctus popoto
|
Sp. nov
|
Valid
|
Schwarzhans
|
Otaian and Altonian
|
|

|
A species of Lampanyctus.
|
|-
|
Lampanyctus profestus
|
Sp. nov
|
Valid
|
Schwarzhans
|
Otaian and Altonian
|
|

|
A species of Lampanyctus.
|
|-
|
Lampanyctus waiohaensis
|
Sp. nov
|
Valid
|
Schwarzhans
|
Otaian
|
|

|
A species of Lampanyctus.
|
|-
|
Lashanichthys
|
Gen. et comb. nov
|
Valid
|
Xu et al.
|
Middle Triassic (Anisian)
|
|

|
A member of Ginglymodi assigned to the group Kyphosichthyiformes and to the new family Lashanichthyidae. The type species is "Sangiorgioichthys" sui López-Arbarello et al. (2011); genus also includes "Sangiorgioichthys" yangjuanensis Chen et al. (2014).
|
|-
|
Latellopsis
|
Gen. et comb. nov.
|
Valid
|
Bannikov & Zorzin
|
Eocene (late Ypresian)
|
Monte Bolca locality
|

|
A member of Perciformes of uncertain phylogenetic placement. The type species is "Psettopsis" latellai Bannikov (2005).
|
|-
|
Lepidorhynchus frosti
|
Sp. nov
|
Valid
|
Schwarzhans
|
Altonian
|
|

|
A member of the family Macrouridae.
|
|-
|
Leptoscopus atavus
|
Sp. nov
|
Valid
|
Schwarzhans
|
Altonian
|
|

|
A southern sandfish.
|
|-
|
Lethrinus? crassiornatus
|
Sp. nov
|
Valid
|
Schwarzhans
|
Mangaorapan-Heretaungan
|
|

|
Possibly a species of Lethrinus.
|
|-
|
Lindoeichthys
|
Gen. et sp. nov.
|
Valid
|
Murray et al.
|
Late Cretaceous (Maastrichtian)
|
Scollard Formation
|
()
|
A member of Percopsiformes. Genus includes new species L. albertensis. Announced in 2019; the final version of the article naming it was published in 2020.
|
|-
|
Liparis? hampdenensis
|
Sp. nov
|
Valid
|
Schwarzhans
|
Bortonian
|
|

|
Possibly a species of Liparis.
|
|-
|
Loancorhynchus
|
Gen. et sp. nov
|
Valid
|
Otero
|
Middle Eocene
|
Millongue Formation
|

|
A relative of the swordfish. The type species is L. catrillancai.
|
|-
|
Lophiodes hoi
|
Sp. nov
|
Valid
|
Schwarzhans
|
Altonian
|
|

|
A species of Lophiodes.
|
|-
|
Lophius alveolus
|
Sp. nov
|
Valid
|
Schwarzhans
|
Altonian
|
|

|
A species of Lophius.
|
|-
|
Lophius onokensis
|
Sp. nov
|
Valid
|
Schwarzhans
|
Mangapanian to Nukumaruan
|
|

|
A species of Lophius.
|
|-
|
Lotella matata
|
Sp. nov
|
Valid
|
Schwarzhans
|
Otaian and Altonian
|
|

|
A species of Lotella.
|
|-
|
Lotella pfeili
|
Sp. nov
|
Valid
|
Schwarzhans
|
Altonian and Clifdenian
|
|

|
A species of Lotella.
|
|-
|
Lotella spicata
|
Sp. nov
|
Valid
|
Schwarzhans
|
Mangaorapan-Heretaungan
|
|

|
A species of Lotella.
|
|-
|
Macrurulus depressus
|
Sp. nov
|
Valid
|
Schwarzhans
|
Bortonian
|
|

|
A member of the family Merlucciidae.
|
|-
|
Macrurulus fordycei
|
Sp. nov
|
Valid
|
Schwarzhans
|
Waipawan-Mangaorapan
|
|

|
A member of the family Merlucciidae.
|
|-
|
Maoricottus
|
Gen. et comb. et 2 sp. nov
|
Valid
|
Schwarzhans
|
Altonian to Lillburnian
|
|

|
A member of the family Cottidae. The type species is "Cottidarum" impolitus Schwarzhans (1980); genus also includes new species M. calidophilus and M. ovatus.
|
|-
|
Melamphaes leeae
|
Sp. nov
|
Valid
|
Schwarzhans
|
Otaian
|
|

|
A species of Melamphaes.
|
|-
|
Moradebrichthys
|
Gen. et sp. nov
|
Valid
|
Cartanyà et al.
|
Middle Triassic (Ladinian)
|
|

|
A member of the family Perleididae. Genus includes new species M. vilasecae.
|
|-
|
Muraenanguilla
|
Gen. et comb. et 2 sp. nov
|
Valid
|
Schwarzhans
|
Paleocene and Eocene
|
|

|
A member of Anguilloidei of uncertain phylogenetic placement. The type species is Otolithus (Trachini)" thevenini Priem (1906); genus also includes new species M. balegemensis and M. lacinata.
|
|-
|
Myctophum bortonensis
|
Sp. nov
|
Valid
|
Schwarzhans
|
Bortonian
|
|

|
A species of Myctophum.
|
|-
|
Myctophum tamumuensis
|
Sp. nov
|
Valid
|
Schwarzhans
|
Clifdenian to Waiauan
|
|

|
A species of Myctophum.
|
|-
|
Myctophum tenellum
|
Sp. nov
|
Valid
|
Schwarzhans
|
Tongaporutuan
|
|

|
A species of Myctophum.
|
|-
|
Mystocheilus
|
Gen. et sp. nov
|
Valid
|
Van Tassell & Smith
|
Pliocene (Blancan)
|
|
()
|
A member of the family Cyprinidae. The type species is M. fresti.
|
|-
|
Nemadactylus trulliformis
|
Sp. nov
|
Valid
|
Schwarzhans
|
Altonian
|
|

|
A species of Nemadactylus.
|
|-
|
Nemadactylus utoka
|
Sp. nov
|
Valid
|
Schwarzhans
|
Waitakian
|
Otekaike Limestone
|

|
A species of Nemadactylus.
|
|-
|
Neobythites turpidus
|
Sp. nov
|
Valid
|
Schwarzhans
|
Runangan
|
|

|
A species of Neobythites.
|
|-
|
Nezumia morgansi
|
Sp. nov
|
Valid
|
Schwarzhans
|
Bortonian and Kaiatan
|
|

|
A species of Nezumia.
|
|-
|
Notoconger
|
Gen. et 2 sp. nov
|
Valid
|
Schwarzhans
|
Runangan to Altonian
|
|

|
A member of the family Congridae. The type species is N. hesperis; genus also includes N. devexus.
|
|-
|
Notoscopelus effertus
|
Sp. nov
|
Valid
|
Schwarzhans
|
Kapitean
|
|

|
A species of Notoscopelus.
|
|-
|
Notoscopelus praejaponicus
|
Sp. nov
|
Valid
|
Schwarzhans & Ohe
|
Pleistocene (Calabrian)
|
Chinen Formation
Hijikata Formation
|

|
A species of Notoscopelus.
|
|-
|
Opistognathus wharekuriensis
|
Sp. nov
|
Valid
|
Schwarzhans
|
Duntroonian
|
|

|
A species of Opistognathus.
|
|-
|
Oreochromimos
|
Gen. et sp. nov
|
|
Penk et al.
|
Miocene
|
Ngorora Formation
|

|
A cichlid belonging to the tribe Oreochromini. The type species is O. kabchorensis.
|
|-
|
Padangia
|
Gen. et comb. nov
|
Valid
|
Murray
|
Probably Eocene
|
|

|
A member of the family Cyprinidae. Genus includes "Sardinioides" amblyostoma von der Marck (1876).
|
|-
|
Panturichthys grenfelli
|
Sp. nov
|
Valid
|
Schwarzhans
|
Otaian
|
|

|
A species of Panturichthys.
|
|-
|
Paralabrus
|
Gen. et sp. nov.
|
Valid
|
Bannikov & Zorzin
|
Eocene (late Ypresian)
|
Monte Bolca locality
|

|
Possibly a wrasse. The type species is P. rossiae.
|
|-
|
Parapercis bispicatus
|
Sp. nov
|
Valid
|
Schwarzhans
|
Otaian and Altonian
|
|

|
A species of Parapercis.
|
|-
|
Parapercis depressidorsalis
|
Sp. nov
|
Valid
|
Schwarzhans
|
Waitakian to Altonian
|
|

|
A species of Parapercis.
|
|-
|
Parapercis fatoides
|
Sp. nov
|
Valid
|
Schwarzhans
|
Otaian
|
|

|
A species of Parapercis.
|
|-
|
Parapercis pareoraensis
|
Sp. nov
|
Valid
|
Schwarzhans
|
Altonian
|
|

|
A species of Parapercis.
|
|-
|
Parapercis richardsoni
|
Sp. nov
|
Valid
|
Schwarzhans
|
Waipawan to Porangan
|
|

|
A species of Parapercis.
|
|-
|
Parapercis waiwaia
|
Sp. nov
|
Valid
|
Schwarzhans
|
Opoitian
|
|

|
A species of Parapercis.
|
|-
|
Parascombrops giganteus
|
Sp. nov
|
Valid
|
Schwarzhans
|
Mangaorapan
|
|

|
A member of the family Acropomatidae.
|
|-
|
Parascombrops schwarzhansi
|
Sp. nov
|
Valid
|
Van Hinsbergh & Helwerda
|
Late Pliocene to early Pleistocene
|
|

|
A member of the family Acropomatidae.
|
|-
|
Paraulopus rallus
|
Sp. nov
|
Valid
|
Schwarzhans
|
Bortonian
|
|

|
A species of Paraulopus.
|
|-
|
Pelargorhynchus grandis
|
Sp. nov
|
|
Wallaard et al.
|
Late Cretaceous (Maastrichtian)
|
Maastricht Formation
|

|
A member of Aulopiformes belonging to the family Dercetidae.
|
|-
|
Pempheris hurupiensis
|
Sp. nov
|
Valid
|
Schwarzhans
|
Tongaporutuan
|
Hurupi Formation
|

|
A species of Pempheris.
|
|-
|
Phractocephalus yaguaron
|
Sp. nov
|
Valid
|
Bogan & Agnolín
|
Late Miocene
|
|

|
A relative of the redtail catfish.
|
|-
|
Physiculus beui
|
Sp. nov
|
Valid
|
Schwarzhans
|
Otaian and Altonian
|
|

|
A species of Physiculus.
|
|-
|
Platycephalus? iaiunus
|
Sp. nov
|
Valid
|
Schwarzhans
|
Mangaorapan to Bortonian
|
|

|
Possibly a species of Platycephalus.
|
|-
|
Platycephalus? riremoana
|
Sp. nov
|
Valid
|
Schwarzhans
|
Runangan
|
|

|
Possibly a species of Platycephalus.
|
|-
|
Platysiagum sinensis
|
Sp. nov
|
Valid
|
Wen et al.
|
Middle Triassic (Anisian)
|
Guanling Formation
|

|
|
|-
|
Protomyctophum ahunga
|
Sp. nov
|
Valid
|
Schwarzhans
|
Altonian
|
|

|
A species of Protomyctophum.
|
|-
|
Pseudaequalobythites
|
Gen. et sp. et comb. nov
|
Valid
|
Schwarzhans
|
Paleocene and Eocene
|
|

|
A member of the family Ophidiidae. The type species is P. biplex; genus also includes "Otolithus" hilgendorfi Koken (1891).
|
|-
|
Pseudanthias multicrenatus
|
Sp. nov
|
Valid
|
Schwarzhans
|
Mangaorapan to Bortonian
|
|

|
A species of Pseudanthias.
|
|-
|
Pseudocaranx? pertenuis
|
Sp. nov
|
Valid
|
Schwarzhans
|
Altonian
|
|

|
Possibly a species of Pseudocaranx.
|
|-
|
Pseudophycis muringa
|
Sp. nov
|
Valid
|
Schwarzhans
|
Lillburnian
|
|

|
A species of Pseudophycis.
|
|-
|
Pterygotrigla stewarti
|
Sp. nov
|
Valid
|
Schwarzhans
|
Otaian and Altonian
|
|

|
A species of Pterygotrigla.
|
|-
|
Pteronisculus nevadanus
|
Sp. nov
|
Valid
|
Romano et al.
|
Early Triassic (Induan)
|
Candelaria Formation
|
()
|
Possibly a member of the family Turseoidae.
|
|-
|
Pycnodus multicuspidatus
|
Sp. nov
|
Valid
|
Vullo et al.
|
Paleocene (Thanetian)
|
|

|
|
|-
|
Quasinectes
|
Gen. et sp. nov.
|
Valid
|
Bannikov & Zorzin
|
Eocene (late Ypresian)
|
Monte Bolca locality
|

|
A member of Perciformes of uncertain phylogenetic placement. The type species is Q. durello.
|
|-
|
Rebekkachromis
|
Gen. et 2 sp. nov
|
Valid
|
Kevrekidis, Valtl & Reichenbacher in Kevrekidis et al.
|
Miocene
|
Ngorora Formation
|

|
A cichlid belonging to the subfamily Pseudocrenilabrinae and the tribe Oreochromini. The type species is R. ngororus; genus also includes R. kiptalami.
|
|-
|
Rhamphogobius
|
Gen. et sp. et comb. nov
|
Valid
|
Bradić-Milinović, Ahnelt & Schwarzhans in Bradić-Milinović et al.
|
Early Miocene
|
|

|
A member of the family Gobiidae. The type species is R. varidens; genus also includes "Gobius" doppleri Reichenbacher (1993), "Gobius" gregori Reichenbacher (1993) and "Gobius" helvetiae Salis (1967).
|
|-
|
Rhynchoconger otaianus
|
Sp. nov
|
Valid
|
Schwarzhans
|
Waipawan-Mangaorapan
|
|

|
A species of Rhynchoconger.
|
|-
|
Saccogaster parengarenga
|
Sp. nov
|
Valid
|
Schwarzhans
|
Otaian to Clifdenian
|
|

|
A species of Saccogaster.
|
|-
|
Sardinella claviformis
|
Sp. nov
|
Valid
|
Schwarzhans
|
Altonian
|
|

|
A species of Sardinella.
|
|-
|
Sardinella lintriculus
|
Sp. nov
|
Valid
|
Schwarzhans
|
Altonian
|
|

|
A species of Sardinella.
|
|-
|
Schernfeldfuro
|
Gen. et sp. nov
|
Valid
|
Ebert
|
Late Jurassic
|
|

|
A member of Halecomorphi. Genus includes new species S. uweelleri.
|
|-
|
Scleropages sanshuiensis
|
Sp. nov
|
Valid
|
Zhang
|
Early Eocene
|
Huachong Formation
|

|
A species of Scleropages. Announced in 2019; the final version of the article naming it was published in 2020.
|
|-
|
Scopelarchoides neamticus
|
Sp. nov
|
Valid
|
Grădianu et al.
|
Oligocene
|
Lower Dysodilic Shales Formation
|

|
A pearleye, a species of Scopelarchoides.
|
|-
|
Scopelosaurus? brevicauda
|
Sp. nov
|
Valid
|
Schwarzhans
|
Kaiatan
|
|

|
Possibly species of Scopelosaurus.
|
|-
|
Sillaginodes albisaxosus
|
Sp. nov
|
Valid
|
Schwarzhans
|
Altonian
|
|

|
A member of the family Sillaginidae.
|
|-
|
Sillago maxwelli
|
Sp. nov
|
Valid
|
Schwarzhans
|
Bortonian
|
|

|
A species of Sillago.
|
|-
|
Sprattus arewhana
|
Sp. nov
|
Valid
|
Schwarzhans
|
Otaian
|
|

|
A species of Sprattus.
|
|-
|
Sundabarbus
|
Gen. et comb. nov
|
Valid
|
Murray
|
Probably Eocene
|
Sangkarewang Formation
|

|
A member of the family Cyprinidae. Genus includes "Barbus" megacephalus Günther (1876).
|
|-
|
Symbolophorus moriguchii
|
Sp. nov
|
Valid
|
Schwarzhans & Ohe
|
Pliocene (Piacenzian) and Pleistocene (Gelasian)
|
Dainichi Formation
Nobori Formation
Shinzato Formation
|

|
A species of Symbolophorus.
|
|-
|
Symbolophorus opononiensis
|
Sp. nov
|
Valid
|
Schwarzhans
|
Waitakian and Otaian
|
|

|
A species of Symbolophorus.
|
|-
|
Symbolophorus tongaporutuensis
|
Sp. nov
|
Valid
|
Schwarzhans
|
Tongaporutuan
|
|

|
A species of Symbolophorus.
|
|-
|
Symphysanodon inamata
|
Sp. nov
|
Valid
|
Schwarzhans
|
Mangaorapan to Bortonian
|
|

|
A species of Symphysanodon.
|
|-
|
Thalasseleotris whatua
|
Sp. nov
|
Valid
|
Schwarzhans
|
Lillburnian
|
|

|
A species of Thalasseleotris.
|
|-
|
Tharsis elleri
|
Sp. nov
|
Valid
|
Arratia, Schultze & Tischlinger
|
Late Jurassic (Tithonian)
|
Altmühltal Formation
|

|
A teleost belonging to the family Ascalaboidae.
|
|-
|
Thiollierepycnodus
|
Gen. et comb. nov
|
Valid
|
Ebert
|
Late Jurassic
|
|

|
A member of the family Pycnodontidae; a new genus for "Pycnodus wagneri Thiollière (1852).
|
|-
|Thryptodus loomisi|
Sp. nov
|
Valid
|
Shimada
|
Late Cretaceous (Cenomanian–Turonian)
|
Britton Formation
|
()
|
A member of the family Plethodidae.
|
|-
|Tonganago wharenga|
Sp. nov
|
Valid
|
Schwarzhans
|
Waipawan to Bortonian
|
|

|
A member of the family Congridae.
|
|-
|Tongarewa|
Gen. et 2 sp. nov
|
Valid
|
Schwarzhans
|
Duntroonian to Altonian
|
|

|
A threefin blenny. The type species is T. waihaoensis; genus also includes T. clementsi.
|
|-
|Toroatherina|
Gen. et sp. et comb. nov
|
Valid
|
Schwarzhans
|
Eocene
|
|

|
An Old World silverside. The type species is T. toroa; genus also includes "Otolithus (Mugilidarum)" debilis Koken (1891).
|
|-
|Toxopyge|
Gen. et sp. et comb. nov
|
Valid
|
Bradić-Milinović, Ahnelt & Schwarzhans in Bradić-Milinović et al.|
Early Miocene
|
|

|
A member of the family Gobiidae. The type species is T. campylus; genus also includes "Gobius" longus Salis (1967).
|
|-
|Trachyrincus aulax|
Sp. nov
|
Valid
|
Schwarzhans
|
Otaian to Tongaporutuan
|
|

|
A species of Trachyrincus.
|
|-
|Tranawuen|
Gen. et comb. nov
|
Valid
|
Gouiric-Cavalli, Remírez & Kriwet
|
Early Cretaceous (Valanginian–early Hauterivian)
|
Agrio Formation
|

|
A member of Pycnodontiformes. Genus includes "Macromesodon" agrioensis.
|
|-
|Trawdenia|
Gen. et comb. nov 
|
Valid
|
Coates & Tietjen
|
Carboniferous (Pennsylvanian)
|
|

|
An early ray-finned fish. The type species is "Rhadinichthys" planti Traquair (1888); genus also includes "Mesopoma" carricki Coates (1993) and "Mesopoma" pancheni Coates (1993).
|
|-
|Tunisiaclupea|
Gen. et sp. nov
|
Valid
|
Boukhalfa et al.|
Early Cretaceous (Barremian)
|
Chotts Basin
|

|
A member of Clupeomorpha belonging to the group Ellimmichthyiformes and to the family Paraclupeidae. Genus includes new species T. speratus.
|
|-
|Uranoscopus rudis|
Sp. nov
|
Valid
|
Schwarzhans
|
Duntroonian
|
Chatton Formation
|

|
A species of Uranoscopus.
|
|-
|Uranoscopus tectiformis|
Sp. nov
|
Valid
|
Schwarzhans
|
Altonian
|
|

|
A species of Uranoscopus.
|
|-
|Valenciennellus fastigatus|
Sp. nov
|
Valid
|
Schwarzhans
|
Otaian and Altonian
|
|

|
A species of Valenciennellus.
|
|-
|Veridagon|
Gen. et sp. nov
|
Valid
|
Díaz-Cruz, Alvarado-Ortega & Carbot-Chanona
|
Late Cretaceous (Cenomanian)
|
Cintalapa Formation
|

|
A member of Aulopiformes belonging to the family Enchodontidae. Genus includes new species V. avendanoi.
|
|-
|Vinciguerria orientalis|
Sp. nov
|
Valid
|
Nam, Ko & Nazarkin
|
Middle Miocene
|
Duho Formation
|

|
A species of Vinciguerria.
|
|-
|Waihaoclupea|
Gen. et sp. nov
|
Valid
|
Schwarzhans
|
Mangaorapan to Bortonian
|
|

|
A member of the family Clupeidae. The type species is W. pinguis.
|
|-
|Waitahana|
Gen. et comb. nov
|
Valid
|
Schwarzhans
|
Otaian to Waiauan
|
|

|
A southern sandfish. The type species is "Trachinoideorum" sagittiformis Schwarzhans (1980); genus also includes "Citharus" latisulcatus Frost (1924) and "Trachinoideorum" ultimus  Schwarzhans (1980).
|
|-
|Waitakia aho|
Sp. nov
|
Valid
|
Schwarzhans
|
Mangaorapan to Porangan
|
|

|
A member of the family Hemerocoetidae.
|
|-
|Waitakia proclinens|
Sp. nov
|
Valid
|
Schwarzhans
|
Mangaorapan to Bortonian
|
|

|
A member of the family Hemerocoetidae.
|
|-
|Waitakia profunda|
Sp. nov
|
Valid
|
Schwarzhans
|
Kaiatan to Runangan
|
|

|
A member of the family Hemerocoetidae.
|
|-
|Xenocephalus otaianus|
Sp. nov
|
Valid
|
Schwarzhans
|
Otaian
|
|

|
A species of Xenocephalus.
|
|-
|Yudaiichthys|
Gen. et sp. nov
|
Valid
|
Xu et al.|
Middle Triassic (Anisian)
|
Guanling Formation
|

|
A member of Ginglymodi assigned to the group Kyphosichthyiformes and to the new family Lashanichthyidae. The type species is Y. eximius.
|
|-
|Zandtfuro|
Gen. et sp. nov
|
Valid
|
Ebert
|
Late Jurassic
|
|

|
A member of Halecomorphi. Genus includes new species Z. tischlingeri.
|
|-
|Zonobythites cornifer|
Sp. nov
|
Valid
|
Schwarzhans
|
Porangan and Bortonian
|
|

|
A member of the family Ophidiidae.
|
|-
|}

Lobe-finned fishes

Other fishes

General research
 Revision of Early Devonian psammosteids described by Beverly Halstead from the so-called "Placoderm Sandstone" (Świętokrzyskie Mountains, Poland) is published by Dec (2019).
 A study on the locomotion of psammosteids, focusing on the influence of the shape of the psammosteid body form on hydrodynamic performance, is published by Dec (2019).
 A study on the anatomy of dermal plates of Astraspis is published by Lemierre & Germain (2019), who report possible evidence of presence of proliferative cartilage in this taxon.
 A study on the anatomy of the circulatory system of the head of Shuyu is published by Gai, Zhu & Donoghue (2019).
 Redescription of Sinogaleaspis shankouensis, based on data from 11 new specimens from the Silurian Xikeng Formation (Jiangxi, China), is published online by Gai et al. (2019).
 A study on the anatomy of the dermal skeleton of Tremataspis mammillata is published by O'Shea, Keating & Donoghue (2019).
 Redescription of Asterolepis orcadensis based on newly collected fossil material is published by Newman, den Blaauwen & Leather (2019).
 A study on the morphology of the jaw elements of a buchanosteoid placoderm specimen ANU V244 from the Early Devonian limestones (~400 Ma) at Burrinjuck, near Canberra (Australia) is published by Hu et al. (2019).
 A specimen of Dunkleosteus terrelli preserving vertebrae fused into a structure known as the synarcual is described from the Devonian Cleveland Shale Member of the Ohio Shale Formation (Ohio, United States) by Johanson et al. (2019).
 A redescription and a study on the phylogenetic relationships of a putative antiarch Silurolepis platydorsalis is published by Zhu, Lu & Zhu (2019), who reinterpret this species as a maxillate placoderm close to Qilinyu.
 New body fossils of Cheiracanthus intricatus, including the first known articulated specimen of this species, are described from the Givetian Tordalen Formation (Spitsbergen, Norway) by Newman, Burrow & den Blaauwen (2019).
 A study on the anatomy of the skeletal elements of the pharynx of Ptomacanthus anglicus, and on its implications for the knowledge of the evolution of the pharynx of jawed vertebrates, is published by Dearden, Stockey & Brazeau (2019).
 Description of fossils of Carboniferous (Mississippian) cartilaginous fishes from the area of Krzeszowice (Poland) is published by Ginter & Złotnik (2019).
 A study on microwear on teeth of Edestus minor, and on its implications for the knowledge of function of teeth of this fish, is published by Itano (2019).
 A revision of species belonging to the genus Edestus is published by Tapanila & Pruitt (2019).
 Discovery of a cast of the holotype of Petalodus ohioensis in the collections of the Yale Peabody Museum of Natural History is reported by Carpenter & Itano (2019), who consider the species Petalodus alleghaniensis to be a junior synonym of P. ohioensis.
 Restudy of a putative bill of an ibis-like bird from the Eocene La Meseta Formation (Antarctica) described by Jadwiszczak, Gaździcki & Tatur (2008) is published by Agnolin, Bogan & Rozadilla (2019), who consider this specimen to be more likely to be a dorsal spine of a chimaeroid cartilaginous fish.
 A study on the anatomy of the skull of Tristychius arcuatus, providing evidence of adaptations for suction feeding, is published by Coates et al. (2019).
 Description of the first skeletal remains of Phoebodus from the Famennian of the Maïder region of Morocco, providing new information on the anatomy of this species, and a study on the phylogenetic affinities of Phoebodus is published by Frey et al. (2019).
 Teeth of a hybodont shark belonging to the genus Asteracanthus, with anatomy indicative of a crushing feeding behaviour, are described from the Upper Jurassic deposits of the Monte Nerone Pelagic Carbonate Platform, in the Umbria‐Marche‐Sabina Palaeogeographic Domain (Italy) by Citton et al. (2019).
 An association of 58 teeth of Ptychodus anonymus, representing the first occurrence of an associated dentition of this species, is described from the Cenomanian Jetmore Member of the Greenhorn Formation (Kansas, United States) by Hamm (2019).
 Description of new associated skeletal remains of Ischyrhiza mira from the Upper Cretaceous of Tennessee and Alabama and a study on the paleobiology of this species is published by Sternes & Shimada (2019).
 A study on the anatomy and phylogenetic relationships of Promyliobatis gazolai is published by Marramà et al. (2019).
 Fossils of members of the genus Aetomylaeus are described from localities in Peru and Chile by Villafaña et al. (2019), representing the first unambiguous fossil record of this genus from the Neogene of the southeastern Pacific.
 A specimen of the whiptail stingray species Tethytrygon muricatus preserving the uterus bearing four eggs is described from the Eocene of the Monte Bolca locality (Italy) by Fanti, Mazzuferi & Marramà (2019).
 Description of Langhian ray fossils from the Lower Tagus Basin (Portugal) is published by Fialho, Balbino & Antues (2019).
 A study on the taxonomic status and geological age of large shark remains from the Upper Cretaceous of the Castellavazzo locality (Italy) discovered in the 19th century is published by Conte et al. (2019).
 15 partial skeletons of lamniform sharks, including the largest specimen of Cretoxyrhina mantelli known to date, are described from the Upper Cretaceous Scaglia Rossa Formation (Italy) by Amalfitano et al. (2019), who also review the taxonomic history of C. mantelli.
 A study on teeth histology and mineralization pattern in lamniform sharks, based on data from extant and fossil taxa (including enigmatic galeomorph shark Palaeocarcharias stromeri), is published by Jambura et al. (2019).
 A study on changes of diversity of lamniform sharks throughout their evolutionary history, aiming to determine the causes of their decline in the last 20 million years, is published by Condamine, Romieu & Guinot (2019).
 A study on changes in the presence or absence of lateral cusplets on teeth of members of the genus Carcharocles from the Calvert, Choptank, and St. Marys formations, and on their implications for the transition of shark populations from these formations from a Carcharocles chubutensis-dominated population to one dominated by C. megalodon, is published by Perez et al. (2019).
 A revision and a reevaluation of the reliability of all post-Messinian occurrences of Otodus megalodon in marine strata from western North America, and a study on the timing of extinction of this species, is published by Boessenecker et al. (2019).
 A study on the body size of Otodus megalodon, as inferred from the relationship between the ontogenetic development of teeth and total body length in the great white shark, is published by Shimada (2019).
 Partial forelimb of a rorqual with several shark bite marks is described from the Pliocene Burica Formation (Panama) by Cortés et al. (2019).
 A study on the anatomy of the holotype specimen of a putative Paleocene shark Platyacrodus unicus is published by Bogan, Agnolin & Ezcurra (2019), who reinterpret this specimen as a carapace of a small retroplumid crab belonging to the genus Costacopluma.
 An assemblage of well-preserved isolated teeth of elasmobranchs is described from the late Oligocene of the North Alpine Foreland Basin (Austria) by Feichtinger et al. (2019).
 Description of the deep-sea elasmobranch fauna from the Miocene Yatsuo Group in central Japan, including the first fossil occurrences of the genera Arhynchobatis and Pseudoraja, will be published by Nishimatsu & Ujihara (2019).
 Description of the deep-sea elasmobranch fossils from the Miocene Makino Formation in southwest Japan, including the first fossil occurrences of the genera Springeria and Narke, is published by Nishimatsu (2019).
 A study on Paleocene cartilaginous fish fossils from the Lower Clayton Limestone Unit of the Midway Group near Malvern, Arkansas, evaluating the implications of these fossils for the knowledge of cartilaginous fish diversity across the Cretaceous-Paleogene boundary in the Malvern region and Gulf Coastal Plain of southwestern Arkansas, is published online by Maisch, Becker & Griffiths (2019).
 A study on the morphology of scales and squamation pattern in Guiyu oneiros is published by Cui, Qiao & Zhu (2019).
 A study on the anatomy and phylogenetic relationships of Brazilichthys macrognathus is published by Figueroa, Friedman & Gallo (2019).
 Permian species Palaeothrissum inaequilobum Blainville (1818) and P. parvum Blainville (1818) are found to be senior synonyms of the widely used species name Aeduella blainvillei (Agassiz, 1833) by Brignon (2019). Conditions exist for reversal of precedence and Aeduella blainvillei is declared nomen protectum.
 A study on the anatomy of the jaws, palate and teeth of Eurynotus crenatus is published by Friedman et al. (2019).
 New specimen of Birgeria liui, representing the most complete and articulated postcranial skeleton of an adult specimen of Birgeria reported so far, is described from the Ladinian of South China by Ni et al. (2019).
 Fossil remains of a spiral valve are reported in a specimen of Peipiaosteus pani from the Lower Cretaceous Yixian Formation (China) by Capasso (2019).
 Teeth of members of the genus Pycnodus are described from the Upper Cretaceous Cap de Naze marine formation (Senegal) by Capasso (2019).
 Description of a partial skeleton of Micropycnodon kansasensis from the Smoky Hill Chalk Member of the Niobrara Chalk (Kansas, United States), providing new information on the anatomy of this species, is published by Cronin & Shimada (2019).
 A study on the paleobiology of specimens of Nursallia gutturosum from the Cenomanian-Turonian platy limestone deposit of Vallecillo (north-eastern Mexico) is published by Stinnesbeck, Rust & Herder (2019).
 A study on the anatomy and phylogenetic relationships of Robustichthys luopingensis is published by Xu (2019).
 Fossil teeth representing the first evidence of Late Jurassic ginglymodians from Mt. Nerone in the Umbria-Marche-Sabina Domain (Italy) are described by Romano et al. (2019).
 A study on the anatomy and phylogenetic relationships of "Lepidotes" bernissartensis is published online by Cavin, Deesri & Olive (2019), who transfer this species to the genus Scheenstia.
 A study on the internal anatomy of a left jaw of a member of the genus Scheenstia from the Kimmeridgian Reuchenette Formation (Switzerland) is published online by Leuzinger et al. (2019), who describe a peculiar tooth replacement mode in this specimen.
 A study on the stomach contents of two specimens of Lepidotes from the Lower Jurassic of Germany is published online by Thies, Stevens & Stumpf (2019).
 Six new occurrences of Belonostomus, documenting the biogeographic and biostratigraphic range of this genus in North America, are reported from the Upper Cretaceous of Texas, Alabama and Mississippi by Van Vranken, Fielitz & Ebersole (2019).
 A study on the diversity of pectoral fin shape amongst members of Pachycormiformes is published by Liston et al. (2019).
 A study on the anatomy of the skull of Martillichthys renwickae is published online by Dobson et al. (2019).
 Fossil remains of a member or a relative of the genus Asthenocormus are described from the Upper Jurassic of the Ameghino (= Nordenskjöld) Formation of the Antarctic Peninsula by Gouiric-Cavalli et al. (2019), representing the first record of a suspension-feeding pachycormid from the Upper Jurassic of the Antarctic Peninsula and the oldest pachycormid yet recovered from Antarctica.
 New, three-dimensionally preserved specimens of Pachycormus are described from the Toarcian of Strawberry Bank at Ilminster (Somerset, United Kingdom) by Cawley et al. (2019).
 A study on the anatomy of Pleuropholis decastroi from the Lower Cretaceous (Albian) limestones of Pietraroja (Province of Benevento, Italy) and on the phylogenetic relationships of the family Pleuropholidae is published by Taverne & Capasso (2019).
 A study on the anatomy and phylogenetic relationships of the teleost species Majokia brasseuri from the Middle Jurassic Stanleyville Formation (Democratic Republic of the Congo) is published by Taverne (2019), who names a new order Majokiiformes.
 A study on the anatomy, jaw mechanics and phylogenetic relationships of Dugaldia emmilta is published by Cavin & Berrell (2019).
 A juvenile specimen of Xiphactinus audax, representing the smallest specimen of this species reported so far, will be described from the Cretaceous Niobrara Chalk (Kansas, United States) by King & Super (2019).
 A study on the internal structure of a fossil specimen of Notelops brama, investigated by neutron tomography, is published by Pugliesi et al. (2019).
 A study on the anatomy and phylogenetic relationships of Cavenderichthys talbragarensis and Waldmanichthys koonwarri is published online by Bean & Arratia (2019).
 A study on fossils of members of the genus Capoeta from the Pliocene locality Çevirme (Turkey) and on the evolutionary history of this genus is published by Ayvazyan, Vasilyan & Böhme (2019).
 Evidence of presence of managed aquaculture of the common carp by around 6000 BC is reported from the Early Neolithic Jiahu site (China) by Nakajima et al. (2019).
 A study on the morphology of fossil catfish spines from the Upper Cretaceous Adamantina and Marilia formations (Brazil) is published by Alves, Bergqvist & Brito (2019).
 A study on positions, heading directions and possible behavioural rules used in a group of fossil specimens of Erismatopterus levatus from the Eocene Green River Formation is published by Mizumoto, Miyata & Pratt (2019).
 Description of gadiform fossils from the Eocene sediments of the Sverdlovsk and Tyumen regions (Ural and Western Siberia, Russia), including fossils of members of the family Merlucciidae, is published by Marramà et al. (2019).
 Description of an incomplete percomorph specimen from the Miocene Ixtapa Formation (Mexico), representing the oldest primary freshwater percomorph fish from Mexico reported so far, is published by Cantalice & Alvarado-Ortega (2019).
 A study on the evolutionary history of the fish clade Pelagiaria is published by Friedman et al. (2019).
 A revision of the nomenclature of extant and fossil barracudas is published by Ballen (2019).
 A review of the published fossil record of the family Labridae is published by Bellwood et al. (2019).
 A study on the feeding habits of the percomorph fish Rhenanoperca minuta and other fishes from the Eocene Messel pit (Germany) is published by Micklich, Baranov & Wappler (2019).
 A study on the phylogenetic relationships of "psarolepid" bony fishes, evaluating which characters cause their different placements in analyses utilizing different methods for reconstructing the tree of life, is published by King (2019).
 A study on the ontogeny of the neurocranium and brain in the West Indian Ocean coelacanth, and on its implications for the knowledge of the evolution of the head of lobe-finned fishes, is published by Dutel et al. (2019).
 Redescription of Axelrodichthys araripensis and a comparative study of several other members of Mawsoniidae is published by Fragoso, Brito & Yabumoto (2019), who transfer the species Mawsonia lavocati to the genus Axelrodichthys.
 A study on the phylogenetic relationships and evolutionary history of mawsoniid coelacanths is published by Cavin et al. (2019).
 A study on the skull anatomy of Arquatichthys porosus, focusing on a newly-discovered postparietal shield, is published by Lu & Zhu (2019).
 Description of the posterior part of the skull of Tungsenia paradoxa is published by Lu et al. (2019).
 New fossil material of "Holoptychius" radiatus Newberry (1889) from the Devonian (Famennian) Catskill Formation (Pennsylvania, United States), providing new information on the anatomy of this species, is described by Daeschler, Downs & Matzko (2019), who transfer this species to the tristichopterid genus Langlieria.
 A study on the bone histology of the humerus of Hyneria lindae is published by Kamska et al. (2019).
 Description of new fossil material of Edenopteron from the Devonian (Famennian) Worange Point Formation (Australia) and a study on the phylogenetic relationships of this taxon is published online by Young et al. (2019).
 A study on the anatomy of the shoulder girdle and opercular series of Gogonasus andrewsae is published by Hu, Young & Lu (2019).
 A historical review of the fossil record of Devonian tetrapods and basal tetrapodomorphs from East Gondwana (Australasia, Antarctica) is published by Long, Clement & Choo (2019), who also present preliminary findings on the anatomy of the canowindrid Koharalepis jarviki based on synchrotron scan data.
 A study on the anatomy of fossil coelacanth lungs, on accessory air-breathing structures in fossil fishes and stem-tetrapods, and on the evolution of air breathing is published by Cupello, Clément & Brito (2019).
 A study on patterns of tooth replacement in Onychodus jandemarrai, Eusthenopteron foordi, Tiktaalik roseae and in extant West Indian Ocean coelacanth is published by Doeland et al. (2019).
 A study on changes of the skeletal anatomy of the pelvic and pectoral appendages during the transition from fins to limbs in vertebrate evolution, as indicated by data from fossil lobe-finned fishes and early tetrapods, is published by Esteve-Altava et al. (2019).
 A study on the anatomy of dermal rays in pectoral fins of Sauripterus taylori, Eusthenopteron foordi and Tiktaalik roseae, evaluating its implications for the knowledge of the evolution of dermal rays in early members of Tetrapodomorpha prior to the origin of digits, is published online by Stewart et al. (2019).
 A study on the evolution of the branchiostegal ray series in the skull of bony fishes, as indicated by data from extant and fossil taxa, is published by Ascarrunz et al. (2019).
 A study on the origin and evolution of acellular bone (bone without osteocytes) in fossil and extant actinopterygian fishes is published by Davesne et al. (2019).
 A diverse fish assemblage is reported from the Carboniferous (upper Pennsylvanian) Horquilla Formation (New Mexico, United States) by Ivanov & Lucas (2019).
 A study on the diversity and ecology of Triassic fish assemblages from the Villány Hills (Hungary) is published by Szabó, Botfalvai & Osi (2019).
 Cretaceous (probably Barremian–Aptian) fish fossils with strong affinities with Early Cretaceous faunas of Thailand are described from Pahang (Malaysia) by Teng et al.'' (2019).
 Description of a freshwater fish assemblage from the Cretaceous (Albian-Cenomanian) Açu Formation (Brazil) is published by Veiga, Bergqvist & Brito (2019).
 Description of Eocene (Bartonian) fish fauna from the Luna de Sus locality (Romania) is published by Trif, Codrea & Arghiuș (2019).
 A study on the composition of the otolith assemblage from the Santa Barbara Basin near the coast of California over the preceding two millennia is published by Jones & Checkley (2019).
 A study on the evolution of the herbivorous coral reef fishes, as indicated by data from extant and fossil species, is published by  Siqueira, Bellwood & Cowman (2019).

References

2019 in paleontology
2010s in paleontology
2019 in science